Catalan Regional Action (ARC) was a small centre-right political party in Catalonia, Spain. It was the Catalan affiliate of the Spanish Regional Action party .

See also
 Regional Action
 People's Alliance

References

Political parties in Catalonia
Political parties established in 1976
Political parties disestablished in 1977
Catholic political parties
Conservative parties in Spain